Hamilton Township is one of the twelve townships of Jackson County, Ohio, United States.  At the 2010 census, 614 people lived in the township.

Geography
Located in the southwestern corner of the county, it borders the following townships:
Scioto Township: north
Franklin Township: northeast corner
Jefferson Township: east
Bloom Township, Scioto County: south
Madison Township, Scioto County: west

No municipalities are located in Hamilton Township.

Name and history
Hamilton Township was organized in 1816, and named after Alexander Hamilton.

Government
The township is governed by a three-member board of trustees who are elected in November of odd-numbered years to a four-year term beginning on the following January 1. Two are elected in the year after the presidential election and one is elected in the year before it. There is also an elected township fiscal officer, who serves a four-year term beginning on April 1 of the year after the election, which is held in November of the year before the presidential election. Vacancies in the fiscal officership or on the board of trustees are filled by the remaining trustees.

References

External links

Townships in Jackson County, Ohio
Townships in Ohio